The Mesherskoye peat railway is located in Ryazan Oblast, Russia.

Current status 

Mesherskoye peat railway emerged in the 1952s, in the area Klepikovsky District, in a settlement named Bolon. The railway was built for hauling peat and workers and operates year-round with several pairs of trains a day. A peat factory was built and put into operation in 2013.

Rolling stock

Locomotives 
TU6A – № 2540
TU4 – № 2314, 2314, 2054
ESU2A – № 1003, 997, 684
Draisine – PMD3
TD-5U "Pioneer"

Railroad car
Flatcar
Tank car
Snowplow
Crane (railroad)
Tank car – fire train
Passenger car (rail)
Track laying cranes
Open wagon for peat
Hopper car to transport track ballast

Gallery

References and sources

See also
Narrow-gauge railways in Russia
Solotchinskoye peat railway

External links

  Official Website 
 Photo – project «Steam Engine» 
 «The site of the railroad» S. Bolashenko 

750 mm gauge railways in Russia
Rail transport in Ryazan Oblast